Morgan O'Neill (born 19 April 1973 in Sydney, Australia) is an Australian writer, director, actor and producer. He is also an accomplished professional musician. Having earned an honours degree in Literature from the University of Sydney, he subsequently graduated from the National Institute of Dramatic Art (NIDA) with a BA in Performing Arts (Acting) in 1998. Since then he has worked extensively in the entertainment industry, both in Australia and the US, with television roles including  Home and Away, All Saints, Water rats and Sea Patrol. O'Neill also appeared in Crocodile Dundee in Los Angeles, Joanne Lees: Murder in the Outback, Supernova, Little Oberon and the 2012 Netflix movie, The Factory, which he also directed. He also recently directed the abc Tv Show “Les Norton”. Morgan most recently seen working as a producer on Channel Nine’s The Block.

Personal life
Morgan is a graduate of The King's School, Sydney. Morgan currently resides in Los Angeles with his wife Sarah Sonneville.

Filmography

Awards
In 2005 he won the first Project Greenlight Award of A$1,000,000 to make his film, Solo. The film garnered three FCCA award nominations, including for his screenplay. Since then he has written and directed The Factory and starring John Cusack. His most recent film Drift starring Sam Worthington, Xavier Samuel and Myles Pollard was released around the world in 2013, including across Australia, the US, Europe, South America and Asia.

His films have won awards in festivals all around the world including: The Newport Beach Film Festival in California (Outstanding Achievement in Filmmaking), Rincon International Film Festival in Puerto Rico (Best Feature Film, Best Overall Film, Audience Choice Award), Isola Del Cinema, Italy, St Kilda Film Festival and Tropfest among others. His films have been selected to appear at numerous other festivals including: The Sydney Film Festival, The Hamptons International Film Festival, Manhattan Short Film Festival, Dungog International Film Festival and the Melbourne Comedy Festival.

External links 
 
 Morgan O'Neill on infilm.com
 Morgan O'Neill on abc.net.au
 

1973 births
Australian film directors
Australian screenwriters
Living people
Australian male television actors